is a  former Japanese diplomat and current President of the Japan Foundation.

He studied at the University of Tokyo, Amherst College and Harvard University.

He entered the Japanese Ministry of Foreign Affairs in 1956. He served as the Japanese Ambassador to the Organisation for Economic Co-operation and Development, Thailand and the United Kingdom. In 1997, he became the president of the Japan Foundation.

External links
 Discussion on the future of Japanese society with Hiroaki Fujii

Living people
Ambassadors of Japan to Thailand
Ambassadors of Japan to the United Kingdom
Ambassadors of Japan to the Organisation for Economic Co-operation and Development
Year of birth missing (living people)